Sagaing United Football Club (also known as Mahar United) is a Burmese football club, based at Monywa Stadium in Monywa, Myanmar and represents the Sagaing Region. The club was founded in 2015 and played in the 2016 MNL-2 season. The team's first competitive season in the Myanmar National League debuted in 2018. Due to a promotion in transition to the Myanmar National League, the team's name has changed from "Mahar United" to "Sagaing United".

Club history
In 2015, Phoe Chit founded Sagaing United F.C. and hired former Myanmar national football team defender, Zaw Linn Tun. Sagaing United based is Monywa, Sagaing Region and represent for Sagaing Region.

Club Trophy
League
MNL-2
1st Runner up(1): 2017
League
Myanmar National League
Fair Play Award(1): 2018

Domestic League

2023 Final Squad

References

External links
 First Eleven Journal in Burmese
 Soccer Myanmar in Burmese

Association football clubs established in 2015
Myanmar National League clubs
2015 establishments in Myanmar
Football clubs in Myanmar